Velos is a Greek word meaning "arrow". It can refer to:
 Greek destroyer Velos -  two destroyers that served in the Royal Hellenic Navy.
 Blackburn Velos, a 1920s seaplane co-produced by Greece and Britain